, provisional designation , is a Hungaria asteroid from the innermost regions of the asteroid belt, approximately  in diameter. It was discovered on 1 September 1984, by Italian astronomer Maria Barucci at the Palomar Observatory in California, United States. The presumed E-type asteroid has a longer-than average rotation period of 37.4 hours and possibly an elongated shape.

Orbit and classification 

 is a bright core member of the Hungaria family, a large family of three thousand asteroids located within the dynamical group with the same name. Hungarias form the innermost dense concentration of asteroids in the Solar System; they are inside the asteroid belt's core region, sometimes considered a completely independent population.

The asteroid orbits the Sun in the innermost asteroid belt at a distance of 1.7–2.1 AU once every 2 years and 8 months (977 days; semi-major axis of 1.93 AU). Its orbit has an eccentricity of 0.10 and an inclination of 23° with respect to the ecliptic. The body's observation arc begins with a precovery found in the Digitized Sky Survey and taken at the Siding Spring Observatory in November 1977, almost 7 years prior to its official discovery observation at Palomar.

Physical characteristics 

 is an assumed E-type asteroid, known for their high albedos, typically around 0.4.

Rotation period 

In July 2013, a rotational lightcurve of this asteroid was obtained from photometric observations by American astronomer Brian Warner at the Palmer Divide Station  in California. Lightcurve analysis gave a long rotation period of 37.44 hours with a brightness amplitude of 0.66 magnitude, indicative of an elongated shape. While not being a slow rotator,  has a significantly longer period than most asteroids, which rotate once every 2 to 20 hours around their axis.

Diameter and albedo 

According to the survey carried out by the NEOWISE mission of NASA's Wide-field Infrared Survey Explorer, this asteroid measures 1.728 kilometers in diameter and its surface has an exceptionally high albedo of 0.78. The Collaborative Asteroid Lightcurve Link assumes an albedo of 0.30 – a compromise value between the E- (0.40) and S-type (0.20) members of the Hungaria family and group, respectively – and calculates a diameter of 2.43 kilometers based on an absolute magnitude of 15.0.

Numbering and naming 

This minor planet was numbered by the Minor Planet Center on 26 July 2000. As of 2018, it has not been named.

Notes

References

External links 
 Asteroid Lightcurve Database (LCDB), query form (info )
 Discovery Circumstances: Numbered Minor Planets (15001)-(20000) – Minor Planet Center
 
 

015692
Discoveries by Maria A. Barucci
19840901